City of the Spider Queen is a 160-page adventure module set in the Forgotten Realms campaign setting, for use with the 3rd edition of the fantasy role-playing game Dungeons & Dragons.

Plot summary
According to the adventure background provided, drow priestesses are no longer receiving spells or guidance from their goddess, Lolth. While in most places the drow have remained steadfast, the Underdark city of Maerimydra is in a state of unrest and has been invaded by a host of enemy creatures. Some of the desperate survivors have begun making raids on the surface world. The adventure outline provided states that the player characters will be investigating these raids, travelling through the Underdark and exploring the ruined city, fighting the creatures that have taken it over, ultimately fighting a priestess of the rival drow goddess Kiaransalee.

City of the Spider Queen begins with an introduction on pages 3–9. Following the introduction is the four-chapter adventure scenario: Part 1: Spinning the Web, is on pages 10–44, Part 2: The Deep Wastes, is on pages 45–63, Part 3: Maerimydra, is on pages 64–101, and Part 4: The Undying Temple, is on pages 102-114. The book also features two appendices. Appendix 1: Monsters and Magic, on pages 115-130, features the statistics for several monsters used in the adventure, and also presents a number of spells and magic items. Appendix 2: Creature Statistics, on pages 131-160, contains a summary of the statistics for all the NPCs and monsters that appear throughout the adventure. Included in the back of the book are 16 one-page maps of various locations that the characters may explore as part of the adventure.

Publication history
The book was published in 2002, and was written by James Wyatt, with cover art by Todd Lockwood and interior art by Scott Fischer, Rebecca Guay, Vince Locke, Raven Mimura, Puddnhead, Christopher Shy, Ben Templesmith, and Sam Wood.

Rich Baker commented on how the adventure was developed: "James [Wyatt] and I were present in the original planning sessions with Bob Salvatore, Richard Byers, Thomas Reid, and Phil Athans as the whole War of the Spider Queen plan was hammered out, so the game guys and book guys were able to put together a common plot that everyone was happy with. That said, we hit an early snag when we realized that the adventure's original setting would give away the plot of the second book in the War of the Spider Queen series, but James came up with an alternate location for the adventure that worked even better than the original site."

Reception
The adventure was ranked the 24th greatest adventure of all time by Dungeon magazine for the 30th anniversary of the Dungeons & Dragons game in 2004.

Dungeon Master for Dummies lists City of the Spider Queen as one of the ten best 3rd edition adventures.

James Voelpel from mania.com commented: "City of the Spider Queen is an excellent addition to anyone's Forgotten Realms campaign or with modifications, any Dungeons and Dragons 3rd Edition game."

City of the Spider Queen won the 2002 Origins Award for Best Role-Playing Adventure.

References

 Wyatt, James. City of the Spider Queen (TSR, 2002).

External links
 http://www.rpg.net/news+reviews/reviews/rev_7731.html
 http://www.rpg.net/reviews/archive/10/10581.phtml

Forgotten Realms adventures
Origins Award winners
Role-playing game supplements introduced in 2002